Sunshine is the second studio album from German Dance-Band R.I.O. It was first released on 13 May 2011 in Germany. The album peaked to number 29 on the Swiss Albums Chart.

Track listing

Charts

Release history

References 

2011 albums
R.I.O. albums